Karunaratne Abeysekera (3 June 1930 – 20 April 1983) was one of Sri Lanka's most famous Sinhala broadcasters. He was also a poet and songwriter and was widely admired for his excellent command of Sinhala.

Abeysekera wrote the lyrics to over 2,000 songs, a record for a lyricist in Sri Lanka. His compositions are still covered by some of the island's top musicians to this day, introducing his lyrics to new audiences in South Asia, and his songs are played regularly by the Sri Lanka Broadcasting Corporation.

Early years

Abeysekera was born on 3 June 1930 in Ratmale near Matara in Southern Sri Lanka. He was educated at Nalanda College Colombo. Some of his notable classmates at Nalanda College were Dr Gunadasa Amarasekara, Stanley Jayasinghe, Dr Harischandra Wijayatunga, Dr Hudson Silva, Hon. Rupa Karunathilake, Hon. Dr Dharmasena Attygalle, Dr Henry Jayasena, Bernie Wijesekera. Siri Perera was Abeysekera's Sinhala language teacher at Nalanda.

He was discovered by the children's radio programme Ḷamā Piṭiya ("Children's Field") hosted by Siri Aiya (also known as U.A.S. Perera - Siri Perera QC) and broadcast over Radio Ceylon, the oldest radio station in South Asia. Ḷamā Piṭiya was a showcase for young talents, and Abeysekera performed with his poems on the Radio Ceylon programme in the 1940s. He was an instant hit with the general public and remained a pop icon until his death.

His younger brother Daya Abeysekara was a renowned journalist and an actor. He died on 29 March 2019 at the age of 80. Funeral will be held on 31 March 2019 at Kanatte Cemetery.

A teenage broadcaster
Abeysekera was a pioneering Sinhala broadcaster. He was a rare breed, a "teenage broadcaster" launching a broadcasting career with Radio Ceylon, which he joined in 1950 at the age of 20. In 1958 he was sent to London for specialist broadcasting training with the BBC. Studio 5 of the Sri Lanka Broadcasting Corporation has been named after him.

Career
Abeysekera was an announcer, compere, lyricist, dialogue writer, and poet - he also wrote children's stories. He worked very closely with another famous broadcaster, Vernon Corea. It was one of the most productive radio partnerships in Sri Lanka. His songs have been sung by a range of musicians, among them Pundit Amaradeva, Nanda Malini, H. R. Jothipala, Milton Mallawarachchi, J. A. Milton Perera and Mignonne Fernando and the Jetliners. Karunaratne Abeysekera won the prestigious Sarasaviya Awards for his lyrics on two occasions. The Government of Sri Lanka named a road after him in the capital city of Colombo.

Pioneer Sinhala cricket commentator
Abeysekera made history in the world of radio by being the first cricket commentator using the Sinhala language. He commentated on matches played by Ceylon against visiting English, Indian and Australian teams from the 1950s to the 1970s. He also commentated on local cricket matches. He had to devise cricket terminology to describe cricketing actions - this was uncharted territory in Sinhala; his words to describe various aspects of cricket are used to this day.

Quote on Karunaratne Abeysekera

See also
Radio Ceylon
Sri Lanka Broadcasting Corporation
List of cricket commentators
List of Sri Lankan broadcasters

Bibliography
Cricket and National Identity in the Postcolonial Age, [Hardcover], Stephen Wagg (Editor), Publisher: Routledge; 1 edition (7 July 2005),

References

External links
Daily News Colombo: Karunaratne Abeysekera of Radio Ceylon - The Legacy Lives On
BBC Radio 4 - Empire: Young Ceylonese Talents
Studio Five named after Karunaratne Abeysekera
Abeysekera Peerless Lyricist
SLBC-creating new waves of history
Eighty Years of Broadcasting in Sri Lanka
Reflections on Karunaratne Abeysekera
එන්න මඳ නළේ ගොස් පවසන්න දුක මගේ

Sri Lankan radio personalities
Sri Lankan cricket commentators
Sri Lankan lyricists
Sri Lankan poets
Sri Lankan songwriters
Sinhala-language poets
Sri Lankan Buddhists
Alumni of Nalanda College, Colombo
1930 births
1983 deaths
20th-century poets